The White Mosque was an Umayyad-era mosque located in Ramle, Israel. Only its minaret is still standing. According to local Islamic tradition, the northwestern section of the mosque contained the shrine of an Islamic prophet, Salih.

The minaret is also known as the Tower of the Forty Martyrs. Islamic tradition dating back to 1467 claims that forty companions of the Islamic prophet Muhammad were buried at the mosque, which influenced an erroneous Western Christian tradition from the 16th century that the White Mosque was originally a church dedicated to the Forty Martyrs of Sebaste.

History

First phase
Construction on the White Mosque was initiated by the Umayyad governor (and future caliph) Sulayman ibn Abd al-Malik in 715–717 CE, but was completed by his successor Umar II in 720. The mosque itself was constructed of marble, while its courtyard was made of other local stone. Some two-and-a-half centuries later, Al-Maqdisi described it as follows:

Reconstructions

An earthquake in January 1034 destroyed the mosque, "leaving it in a heap of ruins", along with a third of the city. In 1047, Nasir Khusraw reported that the mosque had been rebuilt.

After the initial reconstruction, Saladin ordered in 1190 one of his outstanding architects, Ilyas Ibn ʿAbd Allah, to supervise what is considered the second construction phase of the mosque. Ilyas built the mosque's western side and the western enclosure wall, together with the central wudu building.

The third phase, in 1267–1268, began after the final fall of the Christian Kingdom of Jerusalem. On the orders of the Mamluk sultan al-Zahir Baibars, the mosque was rededicated and modified by adding the minaret, the dome, a new pulpit and prayer niche, a portico east of the minaret, and two halls outside the enclosure. Later Mamluk sultan al-Nasir Muhammad renovated the minaret after an earthquake in October 1318. The Mamluks again commissioned restoration works in 1408.

The last restoration of the White Mosque of Ramle took place during between 1844-1918. Since then, the mosque has been mostly destroyed, except for its minaret.

Architecture

Outline and prayer hall
The White Mosque's compound is rectangular, and oriented to the cardinal points. A large, open courtyard is surrounded by built structures and walls.

Its ceiling consists of cross-vaults supported by a central row of pillars. The ceiling and the western part of the prayer hall are 12th-century additions made by Saladin, who also had a new mihrab (prayer niche) built.

Much of the mosque was built in white marble with cypress and cedar wood used for the doors. Of its four facades, the eastern one is in disrepair.

Minaret (the "White Tower")

The current Mamluk-built minaret stands on the northern side of the mosque compound, is square in shape and five stories high, each adorned with window niches, and has a balcony towards the top. The minaret was probably influenced by Crusader-era Christian architecture, but it was built by the Mamluks.  tall, it is accessed via a staircase with 125 steps and contains small rooms, which could be used for resting or as study rooms.

Al-Maqdisi mentions a minaret in the 10th century. There is speculation about a minaret predating the Mamluk one that may have been located closer to the centre of the mosque, as remnants of a square foundation have been found there. However, this may have been just a fountain.

Courtyard and cisterns
Below the central courtyard of the mosque, there are three large and well-preserved underground cisterns with barrel-vaults carried by pillars. Two cisterns (the southern and western ones) were filled by an underground water duct probably connected to the aqueduct built simultaneously with the mosque and city, which brought spring water (probably from the vicinity of Gezer to the east). The third eastern cistern was supplied by runoff rainwater. The reservoirs provided water for worshippers at the mosque and filled the pool for wudu at the center of the courtyard, of which only the foundation remains today.

Archaeological excavations
Excavations conducted by the State of Israel in 1949 on behalf of the Ministry of Religious Services and the Israel Department of Antiquities and Museums revealed that the mosque enclosure was built in the form of a quadrangle and included the mosque itself; two porticoes along the quadrangle's east and west walls; the north wall; the minaret; an unidentified building in the centre to the area; and three subterranean cisterns. The mosque was a broad-house, with a qibla facing Mecca. Two inscriptions were found that mention repairs to the mosque: the first relates that sultan Baibars built a dome over the minaret and added a door; the second inscription states that in 1408, Seif ed-Din Baighut ez-Zahiri had the walls of the southern cistern coated with plaster.

See also 

 Islam in Palestine

References

Bibliography

Further reading

  (p.270, ff)

Medieval Israel
Mosques completed in 720
8th-century mosques
Mosques completed in 1268
13th-century mosques
Towers completed in the 13th century
Buildings and structures in Ramla
Umayyad architecture in Israel
8th-century establishments in the Umayyad Caliphate
World Heritage Tentative List